William Dickinson (1746–1823) was an English mezzotint engraver.

Life
He was born in London. Early in life he began to engrave in mezzotint, mostly caricatures and portraits after Robert Edge Pine, and in 1767 he was awarded a premium by the Society of Arts. In 1773 he commenced publishing his own works, and in 1778 went into partnership with Thomas Watson, who engraved in both stipple and mezzotint, and who died in 1781.

Dickinson appears to have been still carrying on the business of a printseller in 1791 in London, but he later moved to Paris, where he continued to engrave, making  prints for the new regime and then for Napoleon; in 1814 Thomas Lawrence and Benjamin West visited him in Paris, the latter trying to persuade him to come back to London to engrave his paintings.

He died in the summer of 1823 and his death  was noted in the Gentleman's Magazine in September of that year.

Works 

John Chaloner Smith in his British Mezzotinto Portraits described 96 plates by Dickinson. His major works were portraits, in particular those after Sir Joshua Reynolds.  He also engraved portraits of:

 John, duke of Argyll, after Thomas Gainsborough;
 Lord-chancellor Thurlow (full-length), Admiral Lord Keppel, Thomas, lord Grantham, Sir Charles Hardy, Dr. Law, bishop of Carlisle, Isaac Reed, and Miss Ramus (afterwards Lady Day), after George Romney;
 George II (full-length), Ferdinand, Duke of Brunswick, David Garrick, Miss Nailer as "Hebe", Mrs. Yates (full-length), John Wilkes (two plates), and James Worsdale, after Robert Edge Pine;
 Richard, first earl Grosvenor (full-length), after Benjamin West;
 the Duke and Duchess of York (two full-lengths), after John Hoppner;
 Mrs. Siddons as "Isabella" (full-length), after Thomas Beach;
 Charles, 2nd Earl Grey, and William, Lord Auckland, after Sir Thomas Lawrence;
 Samuel Wesley when a boy (full-length), after John Russell;
 Mrs. Gwynne and Mrs. Bunbury as the "Merry Wives of Windsor", after Daniel Gardner;
 Sir Robert Peel, after James Northcote;
 Charles Bannister, after W. C. Lindsay;
 Mrs. Hartley as "Elfrida", after James Nixon;
 Napoleon I, after Gérard (1815);
 Catharine, Empress of Russia; and
 others after Angelica Kauffman, Nathaniel Dance, Wheatley, Gainsborough Dupont, George Stubbs, and Morland.
Besides these he engraved a "Holy Family", after Correggio; heads of Rubens, Helena Forman (Rubens's second wife), and Anthony van Dyck, after Rubens; "The Gardens of Carlton House, with Neapolitan Ballad-singers", after Henry William Bunbury; "The Murder of David Rizzio" and "Margaret of Anjou a Prisoner before Edward IV", after John Graham; "Lydia"," after Matthew William Peters; and "Vertumnus and Pomona" and "Madness", after Pine, some of which are in the dotted style.

Notes

Attribution

1746 births
English engravers
1823 deaths